Elissandra Regina Cavalcanti (born 31 March 1976), commonly known as Nenê, is a female Brazilian former football defender. She was part of the Brazil women's national football team.

She competed at the 1996 Summer Olympics, playing 5 matches. On club level she played for Saad EC. Nenê remained in Brazil's squad at the 1999 FIFA Women's World Cup, by which time she was playing for São Paulo FC.

See also
 Brazil at the 1996 Summer Olympics

References

External links
 
 
 
 
 

1976 births
Living people
Brazilian women's footballers
Place of birth missing (living people)
Footballers at the 1996 Summer Olympics
Footballers at the 2000 Summer Olympics
Olympic footballers of Brazil
Women's association football defenders
Brazil women's international footballers
Saad Esporte Clube (women) players
1995 FIFA Women's World Cup players
1999 FIFA Women's World Cup players
São Paulo FC (women) players